Cristiano Caratti (born 24 May 1970) is a former ATP Tour tennis player from Italy. He reached the quarterfinals of the 1991 Australian Open and the 1991 Miami Masters.

Junior tennis career
Started playing tennis at age 9. His younger brother also plays tennis. He won the 1987 Orange Bowl doubles title (w/Koves) and reached the doubles final at the 1988 French Open Juniors (w/Goran Ivanisevic), losing to Jason Stoltenberg-Todd Woodbridge. Also reached the semifinal at the Wimbledon Juniors (losing to the same duo).

Senior tennis career
Caratti turned professional in 1989. His highest achievement was reaching the quarter-finals at he 1991 Australian Open, defeating eventual Wimbledon champion Richard Kraijcek before losing to Patrick McEnroe. Thanks to this result, the right-hander reached his highest singles ATP-ranking on 22 July 1991, when he became World No. 26. He then represented his native country at the 1992 Summer Olympics in Barcelona, but was defeated in the first round by then France's No.1 player Guy Forget.
His last tournament win on the senior tour took place in 2000 at the Knoxville Challenger, where in the final he again defeated an up-and-coming Slam winner, Andy Roddick, who would also be ranked world No.1 three years later.

ATP Career Finals

Singles: 1 (1 runner-up)

Doubles: 1 (1 runner-up)

ATP Challenger and ITF Futures finals

Singles: 19 (7–12)

Doubles: 6 (1–5)

Junior Grand Slam finals

Doubles: 1 (1 runner-up)

Performance timelines

Singles

References

External links
 
 
 

1970 births
Living people
Italian male tennis players
Olympic tennis players of Italy
People from Acqui Terme
Tennis players at the 1992 Summer Olympics
Sportspeople from the Province of Alessandria